Katerina Jenckova (born ) is a retired Czech female volleyball player. She was part of the Czech Republic women's national volleyball team.

She participated at the 2002 FIVB Volleyball Women's World Championship in Germany. On club level she played with PSG Athens.

Clubs 
 PSG Athens (2002)

References

External links 
 http://www.cev.lu/Competition-Area/PlayerDetails.aspx?TeamID=5320&PlayerID=16868&ID=51

1971 births
Living people